Callimorpha is a genus of tiger moths in the family Erebidae.

Species
The genus includes the following species.
 Callimorpha dominula Linnaeus, 1758

Species formerly placed in Callimorpha 
 Callimorpha quadripunctaria Linnaeus, 1758
 Callimorpha mesogona
 Callimorpha carolina
 Callimorpha terminata
 Callimorpha reversa
 Callimorpha bellatrix

References
Natural History Museum Lepidoptera generic names catalog

Callimorphina
Moth genera